Gary Michael Smith (born 4 November 1955) is an English former professional footballer who played in the Football League as a defender.

Personal life 
Smith attended Barnhill Community High School. He worked as an insurance salesman and later moved to the USA.

Career statistics

References

1955 births
Living people
Footballers from the London Borough of Ealing
People from Greenford
English footballers
Association football defenders
Brentford F.C. players
Wimbledon F.C. players
Southall F.C. players
F.C. Clacton players
Wivenhoe Town F.C. players
English Football League players
Hayes F.C. players
English expatriates in the United States